Claire Rasmus (born December 10, 1996) is an American freestyle swimmer who competes in international level events. She is a four-time Pan American Games champion.

References

External links
 

1996 births
Living people
American female freestyle swimmers
Pan American Games gold medalists for the United States
Swimmers at the 2019 Pan American Games
Universiade medalists in swimming
Universiade gold medalists for the United States
Universiade silver medalists for the United States
Universiade bronze medalists for the United States
People from Atlantic Beach, Florida
Pan American Games medalists in swimming
Medalists at the 2017 Summer Universiade
Medalists at the 2019 Summer Universiade
Medalists at the 2019 Pan American Games
21st-century American women